Peaston is a small settlement on the B6371 road in the parish of Ormiston in East Lothian, Scotland, about  south-east of Edinburgh,  south-west of Haddington,  east of Ormiston and  east of Pencaitland.

External links

CANMORE/RCAHMS record of Peaston Farmhouse
CANMORE/RCAHMS record of Peaston, The Smiddy; alternative names: West Peaston, Peaston Smithy
National Archives of Scotland: Plans of the Kiln Lands of Peaston, Peaston Bank and Peaston Mill
SCRAN image: Aerial View of Peaston Farm in Humbie

Villages in East Lothian